Echinostephia is a genus of flowering plants belonging to the family Menispermaceae.

Its native range is Eastern Australia.

Species:
 Echinostephia aculeata (F.M.Bailey) Domin

References

Menispermaceae
Menispermaceae genera